Short track speed skating at the 2011 South Asian Winter Games was held at Dehradun RSC Arena in Dehradun, India. The two events were scheduled for 10–12 January 2011.
Only three nations competed in the only ice sport on the program, India, Maldives and Bangladesh. India dominated the competition as it won every single medal available to be won.

Results

Men

Women

References

Short track speed skating at the South Asian Winter Games
2011 South Asian Winter Games
South Asian Winter Games
South Asian Winter Games